CMA CGM Kerguelen is a 17,722 TEU very large UK flagged Explorer class container ship owned by the French shipping company CMA CGM. As of August 2015, it was the largest container ship in the fleet of CMA CGM. The ship is named for French-Breton naval officer and explorer Yves-Joseph de Kerguelen-Trémarec. The Captain of the Ship is Captain Lester John Miole MM.

Construction
The container ship CMA CGM Kerguelen was launched in March 2015 and christened in May 2015. The vessel was constructed and projected by Samsung Heavy Industries, according to the latest marine engineering developments and IMO shipping standards. The ship uses the latest developments for economy and safety, and has an increased castle height for increased capacity without changing the dimensions and tonnage.

Principal Characteristics

The cargo ship has deadweight of 185,000 DWT and gross tonnage of 175,000 GT with capacity for 17,722 TEU. The cargo ship has 1,254 reefer points for transportation of temperature controlled containers. With a breadth of 54 metres, it can carry 21 containers across, athwartships.

Engineering
CMA CGM Kerguelen has main engine MAN B&W 11S90ME-C9.2, which has total output power of 87,900 hp at 78 rpm. The engineering on board is equivalent to that of 10 A380 airbus reactors and the electricity, which the generators provide, is enough for a city with 16,000 citizens. The main engine has electronic injection system, which is from latest generation, considerably reduces consumption of fuel (-3% on average) and for oil (-25%). The wisted leading edge rudder improves the vessel's hydrodynamics (optimizing water flow), significantly reducing fuel consumption and  emissions. The addition of a bulb on the rudder, innovative technology implemented on the CMA CGM KERGUELEN, helped to improve the energy performance by an additional 4%.

Sister Ships
 CMA CGM Georg Forster
 CMA CGM Bougainville

See also
 List of largest container ships

References

External links
CMA CGM Kerguelen at ShipsReview.net
CMA CGM christened its largest container ship CMA CGM Kerguelen

Container ships
Kerguelen
Kerguelen
Ships built by Samsung Heavy Industries
2015 ships